Jesse Robinson House may refer to two houses listed on the National Register of Historic Places of the United States:

 Jesse Robinson House (Seaford, Delaware), a mix of Greek Revival and Italianate styles 
 Jesse Robinson House (Wellsboro, Pennsylvania), Queen Anne style

See also
Robinson House (disambiguation)